Sandy David León López (born March 13, 1989) is a Venezuelan professional baseball catcher in the Texas Rangers organization. He has played in Major League Baseball (MLB) for the Washington Nationals, Boston Red Sox, Cleveland Indians, Miami Marlins, Cleveland Guardians and Minnesota Twins.

Professional career

Washington Nationals

León signed with the Washington Nationals on January 17, 2007, and made his professional debut with the Gulf Coast Nationals later that year.  He spent two years in the Gulf Coast League before splitting the 2009 season between the Vermont Lake Monsters of the New York–Penn League and the South Atlantic League's Hagerstown Suns. León returned to the Suns for the 2010 season and was promoted to the Potomac Nationals in 2011. He spent time with the Auburn Doubledays, Harrisburg Senators, and Syracuse Chiefs in 2012 before his first major league callup.

León was called up to the majors for the first time on May 13, 2012. He made his Major League debut on May 14, 2012.  In the fourth inning of his debut, León sprained his right ankle in a collision with San Diego Padres third baseman Chase Headley at home plate.

Boston Red Sox

León was traded to the Boston Red Sox for cash considerations on March 30, 2015. He was designated for assignment on July 21, and on July 30 he was sent down to the Pawtucket Red Sox. He was re-added to the major league roster on September 1. León appeared in 41 games with Boston during the season, batting .184 with no home runs and three RBIs.

León started the 2016 season in the minors, but was promoted to Boston on June 5, when Ryan Hanigan and Blake Swihart went on the disabled list. He finished his MLB season with a .310 batting average in 78 games, with seven home runs and 35 RBIs.

León appeared in 85 games with the Red Sox in 2017, batting .225 with seven home runs and 39 RBIs.

In 2018, León split time at catcher with Christian Vázquez, appearing in 89 games while batting .177 with five home runs and 22 RBIs. The Red Sox finished the year with a 108–54 record and went on to win the 2018 World Series against the Los Angeles Dodgers, with León batting 3-for-6 in the series.

In 2019, León was placed on waivers on March 24, and the Red Sox sent him outright to Triple-A Pawtucket on March 26. He accepted his assignment, rather than electing to forego his 2019 salary and become a free agent. León had his contract selected on April 16, when Blake Swihart was designated for assignment. León was placed on the paternity list on May 17, then activated on May 20, following the birth of a daughter. With the 2019 Red Sox, León appeared in 65 games while batting .192 with five home runs and 19 RBIs.

Cleveland Indians
On December 2, 2019, León was traded to the Cleveland Indians in exchange for Adenys Bautista. Overall with the 2020 Cleveland Indians, León batted .136 with two home runs and 4 RBIs in 25 games. He became a free agent following the 2020 season.

Miami Marlins 
On January 3, 2021, León signed a minor league contract with the Miami Marlins, which included an invitation to spring training. On April 21, 2021, León was selected to the active roster to help replace the injured Jorge Alfaro. In 84 games with the Marlins, León posted a .183 batting average with 4 home runs and 14 runs batted in. Following the 2021 season, León became a free agent.

Cincinnati Reds
On November 22, 2021, León signed a minor league deal with an invitation to major league spring training camp with the Cleveland Guardians. On March 31, 2022, he opted out of his contract and became a free agent after being informed he would not make the Guardians' opening day roster. On April 15, he signed with the Cincinnati Reds on a minor league contract.

Cleveland Guardians 
Facing a shortage of catchers, the Cleveland Guardians sent cash to the Reds in exchange for León on June 28, 2022. León played in a doubleheader that day for Cleveland against the Minnesota Twins. On July 8, 2022, León was designated for assignment. After clearing waivers, León was outrighted to the minor leagues on July 10, 2022.

Minnesota Twins
On August 2, 2022, León was traded to the Minnesota Twins in exchange for Ian Hamilton. León appeared in 25 games for Minnesota, slashing .179/.270/.232 with no home runs and 4 RBI.

Texas Rangers
On January 11, 2023, León signed a minor league contract with the Texas Rangers organization.

International career
Despite his Venezuelan heritage, León opted to play for the Colombia national baseball team in the 2023 World Baseball Classic.

Personal life
León and his wife have a son born in 2017, and a daughter born in May 2019. León is Christian.

See also
 List of Major League Baseball players from Venezuela

References

External links

1989 births
Living people
Águilas del Zulia players
Auburn Doubledays players
Boston Red Sox players
Cleveland Guardians players
Cleveland Indians players
Gulf Coast Nationals players
Hagerstown Suns players
Harrisburg Senators players
Major League Baseball catchers
Major League Baseball players from Venezuela
Miami Marlins players
Minnesota Twins players
Pawtucket Red Sox players
Potomac Nationals players
Sportspeople from Maracaibo
Syracuse Chiefs players
Tigres de Aragua players
Venezuelan expatriate baseball players in the United States
Vermont Lake Monsters players
Washington Nationals players
Venezuelan people of Colombian descent